Sylvie Canet (born 26 August 1953) is a French former backstroke swimmer. She competed in two events at the 1968 Summer Olympics.

References

External links
 

1953 births
Living people
French female backstroke swimmers
Olympic swimmers of France
Swimmers at the 1968 Summer Olympics
Sportspeople from Casablanca
21st-century French women
20th-century French women